Federico Zanchetta (born 23 March 2002) is an Italian football player who plays as a midfielder for  club Olbia on loan from SPAL.

Club career
Zanchetta joined the youth academy of SPAL in 2019, after 6 years at Juventus. Zanchetta made his professional debut in a 3-0 Coppa Italia loss to AC Milan on 15 January 2020.

On 17 August 2021, he joined Lucchese on loan.

On 11 July 2022, Zanchetta was loaned by Olbia.

International career
In 2018, Zanchetta played three friendly matches for Italy U16.

Personal life
Zanchetta is the son of the retired footballer Andrea Zanchetta.

References

External links
 Lega Serie A Profile

2002 births
Living people
People from Biella
Footballers from Piedmont
Italian footballers
Association football midfielders
Serie C players
S.P.A.L. players
Lucchese 1905 players
Olbia Calcio 1905 players
Italy youth international footballers
Sportspeople from the Province of Biella